Graciella circuloides is a species of beetle in the family Cerambycidae. It was described by Pierre Téocchi in 1997.

References

Tragocephalini
Beetles described in 1997